Battarrea is a genus of mushroom-producing fungi. The genus used to be classified in the family Tulostomaceae until molecular phylogenetics revealed its affinity to the Agaricaceae. Species of Battarrea have a peridium (spore sac) that rests atop an elongated, hollow stipe with a surface that tends to become torn into fibrous scales. Inside the peridium, the gleba consists of spherical, warted spores, and a capillitium of simple or branched hyphal threads that have spiral or angular thickenings. The genus is named after Italian priest and naturalist Giovanni Antonio Battarra.

Species
Battarrea arenicola Copel. (1904)
Battarrea franciscana Copel. (1904)
Battarrea guachiparum Speg. (1898)
Battarrea griffithsii Underw., Bulletin of the Torrey Botanical Club 28: 440 (1901)Battarrea laciniata Underw. ex V.S.White (1901)Battarrea levispora Massee (1901)Battarrea patagonica Speg. (1898)Battarrea phalloides'' (Dicks.) Pers. (1801)

See also
List of Agaricaceae genera
List of Agaricales genera

References

Agaricaceae
Agaricales genera